Pinjarra Hills is a suburb in the City of Brisbane, Queensland, Australia.

Geography 

Most of the land between Pullenvale Road and the river is the University of Queensland's Pinjarra Hills campus. The campus is a  research facility.

Apart from the university camps, the suburb is rural residential.

Moggill Road is the main road route through the suburb.

History
The suburb was named after Pinjarra Road which travels through the suburb. However, the origin of the road name is unknown.

In the 1860s Patrick Mayne purchased the land now owned by the University of Queensland. Following the death of Patrick Mayne, it was inherited by his son William. In 1922 William's death resulted in his siblings Dr James O'Neil Mayne and his sister Miss Mary Emelia Mayne inheriting the land. In 1923 the Mayne siblings gave the land to the University of Queensland to enhance the teaching of agriculture. It was known as the Moggill Farm. However, circa 2000 when the university began to plan the relocation of its agriculture and veterinary disciplines to its new Gatton campus which had its own farm, the role of the Moggill Road became unclear. Rumours circulated that the university tended to sell the land for housing which attracted considerable protest. In 2008 the university denied having such plans, suggesting that the rumours arose from the idea being used as a student exercise in a master class, but did not disclose its plans for the site.

The median age of the Pinjarra Hills population was 55 years, 18 years above the Australian median. 68.1% of people living in Pinjarra Hills were born in Australia, compared to the national average of 69.8%; the next most common countries of birth were England 9%, South Africa 2.7%, New Zealand 2.1%, Malaysia 0.9%, Papua New Guinea 0.8%. 88.5% of people spoke only English at home; the next most common languages were 1.2% Cantonese, 0.9% Dutch, 0.5% German, 0.5% Swedish, 0.5% Danish.

Education 
There are no schools in Pinjarra Hills. The nearest primary school is Pullenvale State School in neighbouring Pullenvale. The nearest secondary school is Kenmore State High School in Kenmore.

References

Suburbs of the City of Brisbane